The Argentine presidential election of 1898 was held on 10 April to choose the president of Argentina and 79 of 120 seats in the Chamber of Deputies. Julio Argentino Roca was elected president for a second period.

Background

Having obtained the aging Luis Sáenz Peña's resignation in favor of Vice President José Evaristo Uriburu (who was good stead with both Roca and Mitre), Roca once again carried the PAN standard in 1898. The UCR, which had lost its founder, Leandro Alem, to suicide in 1896, was divided between those who backed Senator Bernardo de Irigoyen's drive to form coalitions with more conservative parties, and those who supported the party's new leader, Hipólito Yrigoyen (who boycotted this and future "election songs" – establishing what later became known as the UCR's "break before bending" policy). Public debate was heated on the eve of the January 30 elections to a constitutional assembly entrusted to increase the number of congressmen and cabinet members, as well before the April 10, 1898, general election. The electoral college yielded no surprises, though, and Roca was returned to the presidency.

Results

President

Results by Province

Chamber of Deputies 

National Autonomist Party and its allies won all 79 seats in the election.

Notes

References
 
 
 

1898 elections in South America
1898 in Argentina
1898
Elections in Argentina